La ronca de oro, is a Colombian telenovela produced by CMO Producciones for Caracol Televisión. It is based on the life of the Colombian singer Helenita Vargas.

Ana María Estupiñán and Majida Issa star as the protagonists, Diego Cadavid, Greeicy Rendón and Marcela Benjumea as co-protagonists, while Laura García, Leonardo Acosta star as the antagonists.

Plot 
La ronca de oro is the story of Helenita Vargas, a woman who wanted to be free in a terribly sexist era of the 1950s, where women had more duties than rights and were sentenced to be mothers and wives only. Helenita found singing rancheras one way to express her deep desire for freedom, overcoming all obstacles in a prejudiced society, starting with her family. Coming music of Mexico, which after years of struggle would bring success, was the origin of the worst humiliations and sufferings, but also became the soundtrack of her two great loves: one that nearly ended her life and another that filled her days with happiness. Helenita made her mark as a woman, as a person and as a singer, anticipating the taste and feel of the people. Like anyone, she understood that popular music has no age, no sex, no class and that in times of violence, which would achieve unite an entire people would be her unique voice.

Production 
After nearly four months at audio and video very personal moments, newspapers, interviewing relatives and friends of Helenita.

Another of the great challenges of the golden husky was in the artistic part, because it is set in the years 1950 and 1970. Therefore, the team recorded several scenes in Buga, a city that retains its colonial architecture. Also at several locations in Cali, the Ortiz and La Merced Bridge are some.

Cast

Starring 
 Majida Issa as Sofía Helena Vargas Marulanda / Helenita
 Ana María Estupiñán as Young Sofía Helena Vargas Marulanda / Helenita
 Diego Cadavid as Álvaro José Sálas
 Leonardo Acosta as Germán Hincapié
 Laura Garcia as Ana Julia Marulanda de Vargas
 Luis Fernando Montoya as Luis Vargas
 Greeicy Rendón as Pilar Hincapié Vargas
 Marcela Benjumea as Estrella Ulloa
 Jimena Durán as Maritza Rengifo
 Ángela Piedrahita as Virginia Tafúr
 Didier van der Hove as Mauro Guerra
 Juan Pablo Gamboa as Rubén de la Pava
 Abril Schreiber as Young Virginia Tafúr
 Diana Neira as Young Maritza Rengifo
 Johan Martínez as Young Efraín Vargas
 Alex Adamés as Efraín Vargas Marulanda
 Viviana Serna as Cecilia Hincapié
 José Narváez as Pepe Pardo
 Marianne Schaller as Clarissa de las Américas
 Mauro Mauad as Gregory Paz
 Emilia Ceballos as Luis's girlfriend

Recurring 
 Rubén Sanz as Giordi
 Ricardo Mejía as Hernando Vargas
 Rashed Estefenn as Ernesto Loaiza
 Mónica Pardo as Young Felicia Vargas
 Camilo Perdomo as Hernando / Nando
 Yolanda Rayo as Graciela Arango de Tobón
 Gustavo Ramirez as Guido
 Alejandro Otero as Enrique López

Series overview 
<onlyinclude>

Episodes

International versions

Soundtrack

Awards and nominations

Premios Talento Caracol

Premios TVyNovelas

References

External links

2014 telenovelas
Spanish-language telenovelas
Colombian telenovelas
2014 Colombian television series debuts
2014 Colombian television series endings
Caracol Televisión telenovelas
Television series about fictional musicians
Television shows set in Bogotá